Ryan Lannon (born 11 January 1996) is an English professional rugby league footballer who plays as a  and  forward for Swinton Lions in the RFL Championship, on loan from Salford Red Devils in the Betfred Super League. 

He has previously played for Salford in the Super League, and on loan from the Red Devils at the North Wales Crusaders and Oldham (Heritage № 1388) in League 1 and Halifax in the Kingstone Press Championship. Lannon has also played for Hull Kingston Rovers in the Super League, and on loan from Hull KR at Salford.

Background
Lannon was born in Wigan, Greater Manchester, England. He is the cousin of the rugby league footballer; Gareth Hock. Lannon was a product of the Salford Red Devils' Academy System where he also subsequently captained the side.

Playing career

Salford Red Devils (2015-18)

2015
Lannon made his début for the Salford Red Devils in a Super League match on 12 April 2015, the game was played against the Leeds Rhinos.

Dual registration

2016-18
Lannon has featured for several clubs on a loan basis namely, the North Wales Crusaders (2016), Halifax (2017) and Oldham (2018).

Hull Kingston Rovers (2019 - present)

2019
In October 2018, it was announced that Lannon had signed a three-year contract to play for Hull Kingston Rovers commencing in 2019.
On 17 February 2019, in a round 3 fixture against the London Broncos, Lannon made his Hull Kingston Rovers début at Craven Park in a 22-12 victory.

References

External links
Hull Kingston Rovers profile
Salford Red Devils profile
SL profile

1996 births
Living people
English rugby league players
Halifax R.L.F.C. players
Hull Kingston Rovers players
North Wales Crusaders players
Oldham R.L.F.C. players
Rugby league locks
Rugby league players from Wigan
Rugby league second-rows
Salford Red Devils players
Swinton Lions players